Aloidendron pillansii, formerly Aloe pillansii, the giant quiver tree or bastard quiver tree, is a large, branching species of succulent plant indigenous to southern Africa. It is regarded as critically endangered.

Description
Aloidendron pillansii grows up to 15 m in height. It branches dichotomously, and superficially resembles Aloidendron dichotomum. It can be distinguished by its paler, wider, recurved leaves, and its taller, more sparsely branched growth form. The branches are made of a fiber that is soft and penetrable, which allows them to store water. Because of its habitat, the Aloidendron pillansii can shed itself of its branches and leaves if they deem detrimental to its survival. 

Its round, bright yellow flowers are pendant, and hang down below the rosette (unlike those of the other tree aloes). They appear in Spring.

Distribution
It is found around the border between Namibia and South Africa, where its natural habitat is upper mountain slopes, in the arid winter-rainfall Richtersveld shrubland. It is severely threatened by habitat loss, illegal collecting, and livestock grazing. The species will not survive without intervention.

Cultivation

It rarely appears in cultivation, as it is an extremely slow growing species, and difficult to cultivate.

It requires full sun, extremely well-drained rocky mineral soil, and very dry conditions. In habitat, it grows on rocky slopes in a desert region which receives its sparse rainfall predominantly in the winter.

References

Vernon, Trail, Jesse. Quiver Trees, Phantom Orchids & Rock Splitters : The Remarkable Survival Strategies of Plants, ECW Press, 2015. ProQuest Ebook Central, 
Duncan, J., Hoffman, T., Rohde, R. et al. Long-term population changes in the Giant Quiver Tree, Aloe pillansii in the Richtersveld, South Africa. Plant Ecol 185, 73–84 (2006).

Asphodeloideae
Flora of Namibia
Flora of the Cape Provinces
Critically endangered plants
Trees of South Africa
Drought-tolerant trees
Taxonomy articles created by Polbot